Ambaria Union is a union parishad situated at Khoksa Upazila,  in Kushtia District, Khulna Division of Bangladesh. There are 12 villages and 7 mouzas in the union.

References

External links
 

Unions of Khulna Division
Unions of Khoksa Upazila
Unions of Kushtia District